Palla publius, the andromorph palla, is a butterfly in the family Nymphalidae. It is found in Sierra Leone, Ivory Coast, Ghana, Nigeria, Cameroon, Gabon, the Republic of the Congo, the Central African Republic, the Democratic Republic of the Congo and Tanzania. The habitat consists of primary lowland evergreen forests.

Subspecies
Palla publius publius (Sierra Leone, Ivory Coast, Ghana, Nigeria)
Palla publius centralis van Someren, 1975 (Cameroon, Gabon, Congo, Central African Republic, northern, eastern and southern Democratic Republic of the Congo)
Palla publius kigoma van Someren, 1975 (north-western Tanzania)

References

External links
NSG database Palla publius Staudinger, 1892 image
Images of Palla publius centralis at Bold

Butterflies described in 1892
Charaxinae
Butterflies of Africa